Jerry Matana (born 14 July 1998) is a Fijian rugby sevens player. He was part of the Fiji sevens team that won a silver medal at the 2022 Commonwealth Games. He also won a gold medal at the 2022 Rugby World Cup Sevens in Cape Town.

References 

1998 births
Living people
Male rugby sevens players
Fiji international rugby sevens players
Commonwealth Games medallists in rugby sevens
Commonwealth Games silver medallists for Fiji
Commonwealth Games competitors for Fiji
Rugby sevens players at the 2022 Commonwealth Games
Medallists at the 2022 Commonwealth Games